Desmond Terblanche (born 27 October 1965) is a South African professional golfer who plays currently on the Sunshine Tour. He has won 12 times on the Sunshine Tour, along with three wins on the Asian Tour.

Terblanche was born in Vryburg, South Africa. He won the Junior World Championship in 1983. He turned professional in 1987. He was married in 1988 and has two teenage children. His 12 wins on the Sunshine Tour came between 1989 and 2007.

Amateur highlights
1980-83 Junior Springbok
1983 World Junior Champion
1985 SA under 23

Professional wins (17)

Asian Tour wins (3)

Asian Tour playoff record (1–0)

Sunshine Tour wins (12)
1989 Bloemfontein Classic, Iscor Newcastle Classic
1991 Kalahari Classic
1993 Highveld Classic, Mmabatho Sun Leopard Park Classic
1994 Royal Swazi Sun Classic
1996 Bearing Man Highveld Classic, FNB Pro Series 5: Botswana
1997 Vodacom Series: Eastern Cape
2000 Emfuleni Classic
2003 Capital Alliance Royal Swazi Sun Open
2007 Samsung Royal Swazi Sun Open

Other wins (2)
1991 SA Winter Championships, Chipkin Catering Supply Sun City Pro-Am (tied with Justin Hobday)

External links

South African male golfers
Sunshine Tour golfers
European Tour golfers
Asian Tour golfers
People from Vryburg
People from John Taolo Gaetsewe District Municipality
1965 births
Living people